Ankit Fadia (born 1985) is an Indian self-proclaimed white-hat computer hacker, author, and television host. He is considered to be a security charlatan.  His work mostly involves OS and networking  tips and tricks and proxy websites.

A number of his claims regarding his achievements have been disputed by others within the security industry, and he was mocked with a "Security Charlatan of the Year" award at DEF CON 20 in 2012. Attrition.org also reviewed his claimed credentials and included him on their Security Charlatans list, calling into question the veracity of his marketing statements. He has been accused of plagiarism in his work. His claims of hacking feats have since been discredited by many magazines.

Early life 
At the age of 10, his parents gifted him a computer and he says he started taking an interest in hacking after a year of playing video games when he read a newspaper article on the subject. He soon started a website hackingtruths.box.sk where he wrote hacking tutorials, which acquired many readers and encouraged him to write a book. The book received favourable responses in India, making Fadia popular in the country, and turned his hobby into a full-time profession. However, he was also accused of plagiarism.

Career 
He continued to produce more books about computer security, and spoke at several seminars across schools and colleges in India. In addition, he started providing his own computer security courses, such as the "Ankit Fadia Certified Ethical Hacker" programme.

In 2009, Fadia stated that he was working in New York as an Internet security expert for "prestigious companies". Fadia also endorsed the Flying Machine jeans brand of Arvind Mills.

Fadia was dismissed by security and cryptography enthusiasts as a 'faker' making tall claims, who attributed his success to the tech-illiterate media. A security professional, who uses the handle @FakeAnkitFadia on Twitter, told The Sunday Guardian, "The first book that Fadia 'wrote' at the age of 14, The Unofficial Guide to Ethical Hacking, was a little over 32% plagiarised from other security publications and websites." Fadia has dismissed the critics who question his credibility as an expert, saying "If I had been fake, my growth would have stopped 10 years ago".

Debunked hacking claims 
In 2002, Fadia claimed that at the age of 17, he had defaced the website of an Indian magazine. Subsequently, he named the magazine as the Indian edition of CHIP magazine, and stated that the editor had offered him a job when informed about the defacement. In 2012, the Forbes India executive editor Charles Assisi (who was editor of CHIP India at the time of the supposed incident), denied that such an incident ever took place after verifying with his predecessor and successor at the magazine as well.

In a 2002 interview published on rediff.com, he stated that at the age of 16, he foiled an attempt by the Kashmiri separatist hackers to deface an Indian website. He stated he gathered information about the attackers, eavesdropped on their online chat using one of their identities, and then mailed the transcript to a US spy organisation that had hired him. He did not divulge the name of the organization he worked for, citing security reasons. The Pakistani hacker group Anti-India Crew (AIC) questioned Fadia's claims: along with WFD, the AIC hacked the Indian government website epfindia.gov.in, dedicating it to Fadia, mocking his capabilities. AIC also announced that it would be defacing the website of the CBEC within the next two days, and challenged Fadia to prevent it by patching the vulnerability but Fadia couldn't.

In 2003, He claimed to have infiltrated a group of hackers and stated that the Pakistani intelligence agencies were paying "westerners" to deface Indian websites with anti-India or pro-Pakistan content.

His own website has been hacked multiple times. In 2009, he blamed the defacement on a vulnerability in the servers of his webhost net4india. Independent security experts contested his claim, stating that the problem was a loophole in his own website's code. His website was hacked by an Indian hacker Himanshu Sharma, where he accepted the challenge from Ankit Fadia. In 2012, his website was defaced twice by hackers. In the first instance, the hackers rubbished his claims and stated that he was fooling people. Another hacker compromised it in response to a challenge that was issued by Fadia on the Tech Toyz show on CNBC-TV18.

In 2012, DEF CON awarded him with the "Security Charlatan of the Year" award citing him to be a fraudster and his presentations outdated. The website attrition.org mentions him as a security charlatan and accuses him of plagiarism in his work.

During September 2015, His official Facebook page posted a certificate which claimed that Fadia was appointed as the brand ambassador for Prime Minister Narendra Modi's pet project, the Digital India Initiative. The government had then announced that it would pluck out young tech entrepreneurs to be its brand ambassadors which included the ilk of Sachin Bansal and Binny Bansal of Flipkart, Snapdeal's Kunal Bahl and Micromax's Rahul Sharma. According to a report in India Today, government sources said there is "No such move to appoint a brand ambassador as reported".

Television and web shows

 MTV What The Hack

In 2008 he started a television show on MTV India called MTV What the Hack!, which he co-hosted with José Covaco. In October 2009 MTV India announced the launch of Fadia's new TV show on MTV, where Fadia gave tips on how to make use of the Internet, and answered people's questions. Internet users could email their problems to MTV India and Fadia gave them a solution on the show.

 Unzipped By Dell

In 2012, Dell India partnered with Ankit Fadia to create a series of nearly 50 videos, each of 1 minute duration to show tips and tricks for the use of computers and mobile phones. These videos were shown on the Dell India Facebook page with an average of one video per week. People also had the opportunity to ask tech queries of Fadia on topics like photography, video making, music composing, navigation assistance, gaming, messaging and others.

 Geek on the Loose

In 2013, Ankit Fadia started a YouTube show Geek on the Loose, in collaboration with PING networks where he shared technology-related tips, tricks and apps. The show was based on situations mentioned in his book FASTER: 100 Ways To Improve Your Digital Life. The show has got more than 750,000+ views on YouTube.

Awards and recognition 
 IT Youth Award from the Singapore Computer Society (2005)
 Global Ambassador for Cyber Security (National Telecom Awards 2011)
 Global Shaper, World Economic Forum

Apart from aforementioned positive endorsements, Fadia's fabricated hacking claims garnered him some negative criticism too. He was nominated among the list of security charlatans in 2012. He was eventually awarded the same.
  DEF CON 20 Security Charlatan of the year.

References

1985 births
Living people
Indian technology writers
Delhi Public School alumni